Organization of Communist Revolutionaries (Marxist–Leninist)  was an Iranian  Maoist organization. It was formed in opposition to the Shah regime in Iran.

OCR(M-L) was founded in 1970 and it advocated against policies of Nikita Khrushchev, describing them as 'Khrushchevian Revisionism'. Instead it supported Mao Zedong and his strategy of People’s war and Cultural Revolution in China. They adopted program that claimed that the ideology of the working class was 'Marxism-Leninism-Mao Zedong Thought'.

Later in 1976, OCR(M-L) merged with the 'Pooya Group',  forming the Union of Iranian Communists (Sarbedaran). OCR(M-L) is regarded as an early part of the current Communist Party of Iran (Marxist-Leninist-Maoist).

References

Banned communist parties
Banned political parties in Iran
Defunct communist parties in Iran
Left-wing militant groups in Iran
Maoist organisations in Iran